The Collegium Studiosorum Veritas is a student fraternity in the city of Utrecht, the Netherlands. Founded in 1889, this is the second oldest in the city. This Fraternity was ranked at the bottom of the second Dutch fraternity division in 2014.

See also
 Katholieke Studentenvereniging Sanctus Virgilius Delft

External links
Website

Student societies in the Netherlands
Utrecht University
Student organizations established in 1889
1899 establishments in the Netherlands